USS Control (AM-164) was an Admirable-class minesweeper built for the U.S. Navy during World War II. She was built to clear minefields in offshore waters, and served the Navy in the Pacific Ocean.

She was launched 28 January 1943 by Willamette Iron and Steel Works, Portland, Oregon; and commissioned 11 May 1944.

World War II Pacific Ocean operations 
Control reached Pearl Harbor 29 July 1944, and during August removed mines previously planted in the defenses of French Frigate Shoals. Between 5 September and 30 November, Control patrolled and escorted ships from Eniwetok to Saipan, Ulithi, and Manus, then sailed to Kossol Roads for patrol duty off the Palaus until arriving at Guam 1 February 1945 to sweep Apra Harbor. She returned to convoy escort duty from Eniwetok until June, when she put back to Pearl Harbor for brief overhaul.

Between 1 July 1945 and 11 August, Control cleared the harbor at Eniwetok and planted navigational buoys there.

Post-War Decommissioning  
After serving at Okinawa between 25 September and 13 October, she returned to the west coast, and was decommissioned and placed in reserve at San Diego, California, 6 June 1946. Her classification was changed to MSF-164 on 7 February 1955. Control was sold on 30 March 1959.

References

External links
 

Admirable-class minesweepers
World War II mine warfare vessels of the United States
Ships built in Portland, Oregon
1943 ships